Jordy Lokando (born 28 April 1997) is a Belgian footballer who currently plays as a central midfielder for Hamme in the Belgian Division 3.

Career
After joining Maltese club, Qormi, in January 2019, he left the club in August 2019 to join Senglea Athletic. However, he returned to Qormi one month later.

References

External links

Jordy Lokando at MFA

1997 births
Living people
Belgian footballers
Belgian expatriate footballers
Association football midfielders
Oud-Heverlee Leuven players
K.S.K. Heist players
Qormi F.C. players
Senglea Athletic F.C. players
Challenger Pro League players
Maltese Premier League players
Expatriate footballers in Malta
RWDM47 players